The Catholic Bishops’ Conference of Malaysia, Singapore and Brunei (C.B.C.M.S.B.) is the episcopal conference of the Catholic bishops of Malaysia, Singapore and Brunei.

The B.C.M.S.B reviews the position of the Church in Malaysia, Singapore and Brunei, and also undertakes a variety of activities covering, for example, the youth, health care and media.

There are approximately, 1.174 million Catholics in total in the three countries; 880,000 in Malaysia, 303,000 in Singapore and 21,000 in Brunei.

Members include diocesan bishops, coadjutors, auxiliary bishops, and diocesan administrators.

Organisation structure 
The organisation structure for the 2019-2020 term.

Apostolic Nuncio
 Archbishop Wojciech Załuski

Board
 President : Bishop Sebastian Francis
 Vice-President : Cardinal William Goh Seng Chye, Archbishop of Singapore Treasurer : Bishop Bernard Paul
 General Secretary : Bishop Richard Ng
 Executive Secretary : Charles Bertille (part-time)

Chairmen of the Commissions
 Commission for Biblical: Vacant
 Commission for Consecrated Life: Archbishop William Goh Seng Chye
 Commission for Diocesan Priests & Seminaries: Bishop Richard Ng, Bishop of Miri
 Commission for Ecumenism & Inter-Faith Affairs: Archbishop Julian Leow Beng Kim, Archbishop of Kuala Lumpur
 Commission for Family and Life: Archbishop John Wong Soo Kau, Archbishop of Kota Kinabalu
 Commission for Laity: Bishop Julius Dusin Gitom, Bishop of Sandakan
 Commission for Youth or Campus Ministry: Archbishop Simon Peter Poh Hoon Seng, Archbishop of Kuching
 Commission for Liturgy: Bishop Sebastian Francis
 Commission for New Evangelisation: Archbishop Simon Peter Poh Hoon Seng
 Commission for Pontifical Missions Societies: Archbishop Simon Peter Poh Hoon Seng
 Commission for Pastoral Health Care: Bishop Cornelius Piong, Bishop of Keningau
 Commission for Pastoral Care of Migrants & Itinerants: Bishop Bernard Paul
 Commission for Creation Justice: Bishop Joseph Hii Teck Kwong, Bishop of Sibu
 Commission for Social Communications: 
 Commission for Malaysian Catechetical: Archbishop Julian Leow Beng Kim
 Commission for Malaysian Catholic Education Council: Archbishop Julian Leow Beng Kim
 Commission for Apostleship of the Sea: Archbishop William Goh

Federation of Asian Bishops' Conferences (FABC)
 Federation of Asian Bishops' Conferences (FABC): Bishop Sebastian Francis
 FABC-OTC (Office of Theological Concerns): Archbishop William Goh Seng Chye
 FABC-OE (Office of Evangelization):'' Archbishop Simon Peter Poh Hoon Seng

Current members
 Malaysia
 Julian Leow Beng Kim, Archbishop of Kuala Lumpur
 Datuk John Wong Soo Kau, Archbishop of Kota Kinabalu
 Simon Peter Poh Hoon Seng, Archbishop of Kuching
 Bernard Paul, Bishop of Malacca-Johor
 Datuk Sebastian Francis, Bishop of Penang
 Datuk Cornelius Piong, Bishop of Keningau
 Datuk Julius Dusin Gitom, Bishop of Sandakan
 Joseph Hii Teck Kwong, Bishop of Sibu
 Richard Ng, Bishop of Miri
 Singapore
 William Goh Seng Chye, Archbishop of Singapore

 Brunei
 Robert Leong, Apostolic Administrator of Brunei

Living former members 
  Tan Sri Murphy Nicholas Xavier Pakiam, Archbishop Emeritus of Kuala Lumpur
  Nicholas Chia Yeck Joo, Archbishop Emeritus of Singapore
  Datuk John Lee Hiong Fun-Yit Yaw, Archbishop Emeritus of Kota Kinabalu
  Dato John Ha Tiong Hock, Archbishop Emeritus of Kuching
  Dato Sri Peter Chung Hoan Ting, Archbishop Emeritus of Kuching
  Paul Tan Chee Ing, S.J., Bishop Emeritus of Malacca-Johor
  James Chan Soon Cheong, Bishop Emeritus of Malacca-Johor
  Anthony Selvanayagam, Bishop Emeritus of Penang
  Dominic Su Haw Chiu, Bishop Emeritus of Sibu
  Anthony Lee Kok Hin, Bishop Emeritus of Miri

Former presidents
  Archbishop John Ha Tiong Hock of Kuching (2012–2017)
  Bishop Paul Tan Chee Ing, S.J. of Malacca-Johor (2011–2012)
  Archbishop Murphy Nicholas Xavier Pakiam of Kuala Lumpur (2007–2011)
  Archbishop Nicholas Chia Yeck Joo (謝益裕) of Singapore  (2003–2007)
  Archbishop Anthony Soter Fernandez of Kuala Lumpur (2000–2003)
  Archbishop Peter Chung Hoan Ting (鍾萬庭) of Kuching (1994–2000)
  Archbishop Gregory Yong Sooi Ngean, D.D., D.C.L(楊瑞元) of Singapore (1990–1999)
  Archbishop Anthony Soter Fernandez of Kuala Lumpur (1987–1990)
  Archbishop Gregory Yong Sooi Ngean, D.D., D.C.L (楊瑞元) of Singapore   (1980–1987)
  Archbishop Peter Chung Hoan Ting (鍾萬庭) of Kuching (1976–1979)
  Bishop Anthony Denis Galvin, M.H.M. of Miri (1969–1976)
  Archbishop Michel Olçomendy, M.E.P. (奧爾科曼迪) of Singapore (1964–1969)

See also
 Roman Catholicism in Malaysia
 Roman Catholicism in Singapore
 Roman Catholicism in Brunei

References

External links

Malaysia
Catholic Church in Malaysia
Catholic Church in Singapore
Catholic Church in Brunei
Christian organizations established in 1964